Zorlu Holding is a Turkish multinational conglomerate holding specialized in textiles, white goods, electronics manufacturing, energy, and financial services. Zorlu Holding is headquartered in Istanbul.

History 
The Zorlu group was founded by Hacı Mehmet Zorlu.

Zorlu Holding acquired the aviation company Vestel in 1994.

In December 2006, the most important stakeholders of the Zorlu family sold $250 million worth of their main controlling companies (Zorlu Linen Dokuma, Linens Pazarlama, Korteks, ...) back to the Zorlu Holding. The shares of Ahmet Zorlu and his family members in the Zorlu Holding lowered from 51% to 49%. Those changes came as the holding sought to consolidate its activities and turn to the international.

In May 2011, the Zorlu Group selected the luxury hotel brand Raffles as the premium hospitality provider of the Zorlu Center, Turkey’s first mixed-use project.

In September 2016, the group was in talk with the Iranian authorities to build gas-fired power plants in Iran. In November 2017, the Zorlu Group opened Turkey's first nickel and cobalt production facility, and Europe's first global-scale smartphone manufacturing plant.

In February 2018, the Zorlu Group signed a $4.5 billion deal with the Chinese GSR Capital to invest in battery production through its subsidiary Vestel and with a plan to build a 25,000 mega-watt battery production factory on a 300,000 square meter area (which would provide batteries for 500,000 cars). Through this deal, GSR Capital took 50% of Meta Nikel Madencilik, a nickel production subsidiary of the Zorlu Group. In March 2018, the management of the company announced preparing its business units for an eventual IPO.

In November 2019, the Zorlu Group announced a $400-million investment to boost its production capacities, and the launch of domestic electric cars on the Turkish market by 2022.

Description 
Zorlu Group companies are active principally in the areas of textiles, white goods and electronics manufacturing, energy, and financial services.

Zorlu's subsidiary Vestel is responsible for the manufacture of a series of PVRs (codenamed T810, T816, T825 etc.), branded in the UK under such brands as Goodmans, Digihome, Hitachi and Grundig. These devices run firmware developed by the British company Cabot Communications.

Organization
Textiles subsidiaries:

 KORTEKS YARN
 BEL-AIR GARDINEN
 ZORLUTEKS TEXTILE
 KORTEKS AFRICA
 LİNENS MARKETING
 ZORLU USA
 ZORLU FOREIGN TRADE
 ZORLU UK LTD
 ZORLU HOMETEKS ZORLU GMBH
 ZORLU MENSUCAT
 ZORLU MACEDONIA
 BEL-AIR INDUSTRIES

Electronics subsidiaries:

 Vestel

Minerals subsidiaries:

 Meta Nikel Madencilik (50% owned by GSR Capital)

Energy subsidiaries:

 Zorlu Enerji:
 42.14% stake in Ashdod and Ramat natural gas facilities in Israel
Coal and gas-fired Lüleburgaz Power Plant
 ZES (Zorlu Energy Solutions) EV charging stations infrastructures
Defence subsidiaries

 Vestel Defence

Governance 
The Zorlu Group is headed by its two co-chairmen Ahmet Nazif Zorlu and Zeki Zorlu.

References

External links
 Zorlu.com: Zorlu Holding' website
 Sumytex.in.ua: Информация о холдинге (Zorlu Holding info)

Conglomerate companies of Turkey
Holding companies of Turkey
Textile companies of Turkey
Companies based in Istanbul
Conglomerate companies established in 1984
Holding companies established in 1984
Manufacturing companies established in 1984
1984 establishments in Turkey
Multinational companies headquartered in Turkey
Turkish companies established in 1984
Coal in Turkey